Prima Thammaraks (born 12 January 1992) is a Thai professional golfer playing on the U.S.-based Epson Tour.

Early life
Thammaraks was born on 12 January 1992. She started playing golf at the age of 8 years old. Hobbies include the classical guitar, drawing, and movies.

Amateur career
From 2010 to 2014, Thammaraks played for the Iowa State Cyclones of the Iowa State University. She was named All-Big 12 First Team member three times from 2012 to 2014. She was also named Big 12 Scholar Athlete of the Year for women's golf following the 2013–14 season.

Professional career
Thammaraks played on the China LPGA Tour and the Thai LPGA Tour in 2015. In December 2015, she finished tied for 26th at the final stage LPGA Qualifying Tournament to earn LPGA Tour membership for the 2016 season. On the 2016 LPGA Tour, she played eight events and made two cuts.

In 2017, Thammaraks captured her first professional win at the RACV Gold Coast Challenge on the ALPG Tour. She also claimed her first China LPGA Tour win at the Xiamen Orient Masters in September. She made the cut at the 2017 Women's British Open and finish in 72nd place.

In 2021, Thammaraks earned her first Symetra Tour victory at season finale Symetra Tour Championship. She carded a score of 22-under par 266 setting the 72-hole scoring record for the championship to win by two strokes.

Professional wins (3)

Epson Tour wins (1)

ALPG Tour wins (1)

China LPGA Tour wins (1)
2017 (1) Xiamen Orient Masters

Results in LPGA majors 
Results not in chronological order.

CUT = missed the half-way cut
NT = no tournament
"T" = tied

References

External links

Prima Thammaraks
LPGA Tour golfers
Prima Thammaraks
1992 births
Living people
Prima Thammaraks